Caenis diminuta is a species of small squaregilled mayfly in the family Caenidae. It is found in Central America and North America.

Subspecies
These two subspecies belong to the species Caenis diminuta:
 Caenis diminuta diminuta Walker, 1853
 Caenis diminuta latina McCafferty & Lugo-Ortiz, 1992

References

Mayflies
Articles created by Qbugbot
Insects described in 1853